The 2007 Redcar and Cleveland Borough Council election took place on 3 May 2007 to elect members of Redcar and Cleveland Unitary Council in England. The whole council was up for election and the council stayed under no overall control.

Background
At the last election in 2003 Labour lost their majority on the council, after winning 23 seats, compared to 15 for the Liberal Democrats, 13 Conservatives and 8 independents. A coalition between the Liberal Democrats, Conservatives and independents then took control of the council.

In 2004 a Labour councillor for Guisborough, and former deputy leader of the party, Keith Pudney, became an independent, before becoming a Liberal Democrat in 2005. However, also in 2005, Labour gained a seat in Westworth from an independent at a by-election. A final change came in February 2007 when David Tomlin resigned from the Labour party after being convicted for falsely claiming benefits. This meant that before the 2007 election Labour had 22 seats, the Liberal Democrats 16, Conservatives 13, East Cleveland Independents 2, the Independent Group 5 and 1 independent, with the Liberal Democrats, Conservatives and the 2 East Cleveland Independents forming the administration, while Labour and the other independents were in opposition.

In total 160 candidates stood for the 59 seats that were being contested at the election. The council already had the best female representation of any council in North East England with 30 women councillors and 75 of the candidates were female. The candidates comprised 50 from Labour, 42 Liberal Democrats, 37 Conservatives, 4 British National Party and 27 various independents. Meanwhile, 7 sitting councillors stood down at the election, Christopher Beadle, Keith Blott, Bill Goodwill, Barbara Harpham, Keith Pudney, Alma Thrower and David Tomlin.

Election result
Labour made a net gain of 6 seats, to go to 28 seats on the council, 2 short of a majority. The gains came at the expense of the Liberal Democrats who dropped 3 to 13 seats and the Conservatives who were down 2 to 11 seats. 7 independents were also elected, 4 in the Independent Group, 1 Loftus Ward Independent, 1 East Cleveland and Guisborough Independent and 1 East Cleveland Independent.

Following the election the Labour group leader, George Dunning, became the new leader of the council, after Labour got the support of 2 independents, Mike Findley and Mary Lanigan.

Ward results

References

2007 English local elections
2007
2000s in North Yorkshire